Milenge Milenge is a 2010 Indian Hindi-language romantic drama film. Largely based on the 2001 film Serendipity, the movie is directed by Satish Kaushik and stars Shahid Kapoor and Kareena Kapoor in their fifth and final film together (to date) following Imtiaz Ali's Jab We Met (2007). Other members from the cast include Satish Shah, Aarti Chhabria, and Delnaaz Paul. The film received overwhelmingly negative reviews from critics and bombed at the box office.

Plot
Priya Malhotra (Kareena Kapoor) is an orphan living in Delhi who hopes to have a family of her own and keeps a diary outlining her dreams and the type of man she wants to meet – someone who does not drink, smoke or tell lies. She is skeptical when her friend Honey's (Delnaaz Paul) aunt, a card reader, Sunita Rao (Kirron Kher), predicts that she will go to a foreign land and find the love of her life in seven days. She is pleasantly surprised when she is selected to go to a Youth Festival in Bangkok.

That is where Immy (Shahid Kapoor) enters. Immy is a complete opposite to what Priya wants in a guy. He smokes, drinks, and lies. Due to his bad habits, Immy is being chased by security and he runs into Priya's hostel room to hide. Before he leaves, he sees Priya and falls in love with her. He takes her diary and escapes. He then pretends to be the guy Priya wants to be with, and the two start a relationship. Soon enough, Priya spots her diary in his room, and realises he had stolen her diary and pretended to be like her dream man. She breaks up with him, and returns to Delhi to forget about her past.

After she reaches the airport, Immy also arrives, and explains to her that destiny wants them together. Priya does not believe him and therefore challenges him that if destiny did want them together, they would both find each other again in future. In order to prove it, she asks Immy to write his name and phone number on a currency note and uses it to buy a Numerology book, in which she writes her own name and phone number and then she sells it in a market. Additionally, Priya takes Immy to a hotel, where they both take separate lifts. If both of them press the same button in the elevator, it will prove that destiny brought them together. Although Priya and Immy press the same button, Immy's lift slows down because a child entered the lift and pressed all the buttons. As a result, Immy could not meet Priya. Now, it was all up to the currency note and the Numerology book coming back to Priya and Immy respectively for them to get back together.

Three years later, Immy is engaged to Sofiya (Aarti Chhabria) and Priya is engaged to Jatin. However, a week before the marriage, both of them land up in Delhi again looking for each other. Priya's search is hindered by the fact that she does not know Immy's real name. After several near misses, Priya finds the currency note and Immy finds the book. They find each other, which is when Immy reveals his real name is Amit. The film ends with both of them reuniting and getting married.

Cast
 Shahid Kapoor as Amit "Immy" Kapoor
 Kareena Kapoor as Priya Kapoor in Sequel née Malhotra
 Aarti Chhabria as Sofiya Rajeev Arora
 Kirron Kher as Sunita Rao
 Sarfraz Khan as Aashish Bihani
 Delnaaz Paul as Honey
 Satish Shah as Trilok Kapoor
 Himani Shivpuri as Mrs. Neha Gandhi
 Satish Kaushik as Eajaz bhai

Production
In 2004, the cast began shooting in Delhi and Dubai, and later continued to shoot at Pathways World School. They were also supposed to shoot in Thailand, but Kapoor asked for a delay to attend the premiere of Dil Maange More!!!, thus avoiding the 2004 Indian Ocean tsunami that destroyed the hotel that the cast and crew had been scheduled to stay in. The movie was expected to hit screens on 23 December 2005, but due to financial and casting problems, it failed to do so. Salman Khan was signed on to do an important extended guest appearance for the film but opted out because of differences with the film's lead pair (Shahid Kapoor and Kareena Kapoor).

After the lead pair broke up, sources indicated that they wouldn't come together to dub for the film. However, the director, Satish Kaushik questioned "...why should Shahid and Kareena have any problems dubbing it?" Producer Boney Kapoor further noted that "...perhaps it was destined that the most romantic film featuring Shahid and Kareena would come after their relationship." In December 2007, sources indicated that the film was scheduled to release the day after Valentine's Day (15 February 2008) but it was again delayed. On 1 April 2008, the director announced that Shahid Kapoor had begun dubbing for the film whilst Kareena Kapoor would begin after she returned from her overseas trip. In February 2009, it was reported that both the actors had finally completed dubbing for the movie.

Reception

Critical reception
Upon release, Milenge Milenge received mixed to negative reviews from critics. Rajeev Masand of CNN-IBN gave the film a rating of 1.5 out of 5 and described the film as "regressive, senseless, and packed with plot-holes the size of craters". Taran Adarsh of Bollywood Hungama rated it 2/5 and said, "Milenge Milenge has the charismatic lead pair, who are very popular with the youth, as its USP. But the problem is its dated look. Having taken a long time to reach the theatres, it will have to rely on a solid word of mouth to lure the audiences into cineplexes". Mayank Shekhar of the Hindustan Times gave it 1.5/5 saying, "Years since, while the film's main pair may not be friends anymore, have probably knocked each other off their Facebook pages, trashed old kissing pics, tucked away the sweet SMSes, they can't quite disown a new release that celebrates them still. Well. Sucks. I guess!". Gaurav Malani of Indiatimes gave the film 2/5 and stated, "Watch it only if you are just interested to see Kareena Kapoor when the term size zero wasn't coined. Else Milenge Milenge doesn't score too much above zero".

Box office
The film opened to a poor opening and collected  in its theatrical run.

Soundtrack

References

External links 
 
 

2010 films
Films shot in Delhi
Films shot in Dubai
2010s Hindi-language films
Films scored by Himesh Reshammiya
Films scored by Sanjoy Chowdhury
Films directed by Satish Kaushik